Kickboxing weight classes are weight classes that pertain to the sport of kickboxing.

Organizations will often adopt their own rules for weight limits, causing ambiguity in the sport regarding how a weight class should be defined. For a variety of reasons (largely historical), weight classes of the same name can be of vastly different weights. For example, a boxing middleweight weighs up to 72 kg (160 lb), an ISKA middleweight upper limit is 75 kg (165 lb), and a K-1 middleweight upper limit is 75 kg (154 lb).

Comparison of organizations
This table gives names and limits recognised by the widely regarded sanctioning bodies and promotions in professional kickboxing, Muay Thai and shoot boxing.

AJKF
The (now defunct) All Japan Kickboxing Federation (AJKF) utilized the following weight classes:

Enfusion
Enfusion utilizes the following weight classes:

Glory
Glory utilizes the following weight classes:

IKF
The International Kickboxing Federation (IKF) utilizes the following weight classes:

ISKA
The International Sport Kickboxing Association (ISKA) utilizes the following weight classes:

It's Showtime
It's Showtime (now defunct) utilized the following weight classes:

K-1
K-1 utilizes the following weight classes:

K-1 JAPAN
K-1 Japan Group utilizes the following weight classes:

KOK
King of Kings (KOK) utilizes the following weight classes:

Krush
Krush utilizes the following weight classes:

MAJKF
The Martial Arts Japan Kickboxing Federation (MAJKF) utilizes the following weight classes:

NJKF
The New Japan Kickboxing Federation (NJKF) utilizes the following weight classes:

PKA
The (now defunct) Professional Karate Association (PKA) utilized the following weight classes:

ONE Championship
The ONE Championship utilizes the following weight classes:

RISE
Real Impact Sports Entertainment (RISE) utilizes the following weight classes:

Shoot Boxing
The Shoot Boxing utilizes the following weight classes:

Superkombat
Superkombat Fighting Championship utilizes the following weight classes:

Superleague
Superleague utilizes the following weight classes:

Thai Stadiums

WAKO
The World Association of Kickboxing Organizations (WAKO) utilizes the following weight classes:

Male

Female

WBC Muaythai
The World Boxing Council Muaythai (WBC Muaythai) utilizes the following weight classes:

WFCA
The World Full Contact Association (WFCA) utilizes the following weight classes:

WKA
The World Kickboxing Association (WKA) utilizes the following weight classes for both amateur and professional competitions:

WKN
The World Kickboxing Network (WKN) utilizes the following weight classes:

WMC
The World Muaythai Council (WMC) utilizes the following weight classes:

WPMF
The World Professional Muaythai Federation (WPMF) utilizes the following weight classes:

See also
Brazilian Jiu-Jitsu weight classes

Boxing Weight Class
Mixed martial arts weight classes
Taekwondo weight classes
Professional wrestling weight classes
Wrestling weight classes

References

External links